Stevan Sekereš (26 September 1937 – 23 November 2012) is a Serbian football defender who played for SFR Yugoslavia.

External links
Profile on Serbian federation site

1937 births
2012 deaths
Serbs of Croatia
Serbian footballers
Yugoslav footballers
Yugoslavia international footballers
Association football defenders
Yugoslav First League players
FK Vojvodina players
Ligue 1 players
FC Nantes players
Serbian expatriate footballers
Expatriate footballers in France